Iwao Horii is a Japanese politician who is a member of the House of Councillors of Japan.

Biography 
In 1988, he graduated from the University of Tokyo and joined Ministry of Home Affairs 
He serves as Vice Minister of Foreign Affairs. During his time, he visited the Marshall Islands in 2018.

References 

1965 births
Living people
Members of the House of Councillors (Japan)